Scepomycter is a genus of threatened birds in the family Cisticolidae. The two species are endemic to highland forests in the Eastern Arc Mountains of Tanzania. They are small, mainly grey birds with a reddish-orange head.

Taxonomy
The Rubeho warbler is a cryptic species only described as separate from the Winifred's warbler in 2009. Winifred's warbler (and by association, the Rubeho warbler) have sometimes been included in the genus Bathmocercus.

 Winifred's warbler (Scepomycter winifredae).
 Rubeho warbler (Scepomycter rubehoensis).

References
 Bowie, R.C.K., J. Fjeldså, & J. Kiure (2009). Multilocus molecular DNA variation in Winifred's Warbler Scepomycter winifredae suggests cryptic speciation and the existence of a threatened species in the Rubeho–Ukaguru Mountains of Tanzania. Ibis 151(4): 709–719.
 Nguembock, B., J. Fjeldså, A. Tillier, & E. Pasquet (2007). A phylogeny for the Cisticolidae (Aves: Passeriformes) based on nuclear and mitochondrial DNA sequence data, and a re-interpretation of a unique nest-building specialization. Molecular Phylogenetics and Evolution 42: 272–286.

 
Bird genera